Hadley and Leegomery is a civil parish in the district of Telford and Wrekin, Shropshire, England.  It contains ten listed buildings that are recorded in the National Heritage List for England.  Of these, one is at Grade II*, the middle of the three grades, and the others are at Grade II, the lowest grade.  Hadley and Leegomery are areas in the town of Telford.  The most important building in the parish was Apley Castle, but this has been largely demolished and redeveloped, and what remains of it is listed at Grade II*.  Other structures associated with the building are listed, and the other listed buildings in the parish include two former mills, an 18th-century house, two locks and a bridge associated with the now disused Shrewsbury Canal, a public house, and a war memorial.


Key

Buildings

References

Citations

Sources

Lists of buildings and structures in Shropshire